Warcraft: The Roleplaying Game was a role-playing game line published by Sword & Sorcery Studios. It was based on the Warcraft computer games and set on Azeroth.

Second Edition 
In 2005, White Wolf Publishing released a second edition of the game rules and renamed the series World of Warcraft: The Roleplaying Game to tie in with the success of World of Warcraft.

Reviews
Coleção Dragon Slayer

References

External links

Fantasy role-playing games
Role-playing games based on video games
Role-playing games introduced in 2003
Warcraft games
White Wolf Publishing games
D20 System